Thomas Kelly (2 October 1885 – 9 April 1916) was an English professional footballer who played in the Football League for Grimsby Town and Glossop as a half back.

Personal life 
Kelly was married with six children and predominantly lived in Stockport, working at the gasworks. On 3 March 1915, eight months after the outbreak of the First World War, Kelly and his brother enlisted in the North Staffordshire Regiment. On 9 April 1916, while holding the rank of private, Kelly was killed in an attack on Sannaiyat, Mesopotamia, during the Siege of Kut. He is commemorated on the Basra Memorial.

Career statistics

References

1885 births
1916 deaths
People from Tunstall, Staffordshire
English footballers
English Football League players
Association football midfielders
Glossop North End A.F.C. players
Denaby United F.C. players
Grimsby Town F.C. players
Gillingham F.C. players
Midland Football League players
Southern Football League players
British Army personnel of World War I
North Staffordshire Regiment soldiers
British military personnel killed in World War I
Military personnel from Staffordshire